Tizit is a village in Mon district of Nagaland in India.

References

Villages in Mon district